Marie Bobillier, real name Antoinette Christine Marie Bobillier (12 April 1858 – 4 November 1918) was a French musicologist, music critic, writing under her pseudonym Michel Brenet.

Biography 
Born in Lunéville of a military father, captain and then colonel in the artillery, Marie Bobillier, a single daughter, lived her childhood in several cities, including Strasbourg and Metz, before finally settling in Paris in 1871. She learned to play the piano, but a scarlet fever contracted at the age of thirteen rendered her disabled, influencing her decision to devote her life to research, after having been to the Pasdeloup concerts. She was one of the first French women musicologists.

Her first publication, Histoire de la symphonie à orchestre (1882), won a prize in Brussels (Royal Academy of Science, Letters and Fine Arts of Belgium), engaging her ever-increasing reputation in the French musicological world. With a rigorous method that drew on the most reliable sources and documents, she made a series of publications – several valuable studies devoted to vocal music by Ockeghem, Goudimel, Palestrina (1906), Sébastien de Brossard, Handel, Haydn, Grétry and Berlioz. Bobillier also approached classical and medieval instrumental music and left a precious and independent Dictionnaire pratique et historique de la musique, completed and published by Amédée Gastoué in 1926.

Her book Notes sur l’histoire du luth en France paved the way for further research in this area. Her major works are Les musiciens de la Sainte-Chapelle du Palais("her masterpiece" according to La Laurencie), Les concerts en France sous l’ancien régime and La librairie musicale en France de 1653 à 1790, where she demonstrates her great scholarship and competence as a music historian. Jean-Marie Fauquet summed up Marie Bobillier's work in one sentence: "It is of exceptional quality, both in terms of the variety of subjects dealt with and the method applied".

She also contributed to Lavignac's Encyclopedia of music. Endowed with a very reserved personality and while "the stage frightened her", she gave a few lectures but declined participating in learned societies.

She left notes, quotations and transcripts, accumulated throughout her research, bound after her death in nineteen volumes, and preserved under the name Documents sur l’histoire de la musique at the Bibliothèque nationale.

Her pseudonym comes from the village of Les Brenets in  the Doubs department, where her father's family came from. She died in Paris on 4 November 1918, aged 60.

Works

Monographs 
  (a work distinguished by the Royal Academy of Science, Letters and Fine Arts of Belgium)
 
 
 
 
 
 
 
 
 
 
 
 
 
 
 
  (contient : Les musiciens de Philippe le Hardi, Jean de Ockeghem, maître de la chapelle des rois Charles VII et Louis XI, et Essai sur les origines de la musique descriptive par Jacques Mauduit)
 
 Musiciens d’autrefois (Paris, 1912)

Articles 
(chronological order)
 Gounod et la musique sacrée ?, Le Correspondant, 10 December 1893 . 
 Quatre femmes musiciennes : Jacquet de La Guerre, Hélène de Montgeroult, Louise Bertin, Louise Farrenc, L’Art 2nd series, volume 4 (1894), (pp. 107–112, 142–147, 177–183/183–187), Jacquet de La Guerre, Hélène de Montgeroult, Louise Bertin et L. Farrenc.
 Les Opéras féminins, Gazette musicale de la Suisse Romande, 28 February 1895, (pp. 68–72).
 "Jean Mouton", Tribune de Saint-Gervais 5 (1899), (pp. 323–334).
 "Guy d’Arezzo", Ponthus Teutonicus et l’abbé Odon », Tribune de Saint-Gervais 8 (1902), (pp. 121).
 L’amitié de Berlioz et de Liszt, Guide musical 50 (1904), (pp. 595–687).
 .
 
 Mme de Genlis musicienne, Revue musicale S.I.M. 2 (1912), (pp. 1–14) Read online.
  (F. Alcan)
 L'Année musicale 1911 vol. 1 on archive.org, Deux traductions françaises inédites des institutions harmoniques de Zarlino (1911) (pp. 125–144).
 L'Année musicale 1912 vol. 2 on archive.org, Participe à la bibliographie uniquement
 L'Année musicale 1913 vol. 3 on archive.org, Bibliographie des bibliographies musicales, Année musicale (1913), (pp. 1–52),

Publisher 
Marie Bobillier published music scores by Alexandre-Pierre-François Boëly at M. Senart (before 1909).
 30 caprices, opus 2 (1816)
 24 pieces for piano, opus 22 (1858)
 Pieces for piano, opus 34 (1810)
 Pieces for piano, opus 47 (1846)
 Pieces for piano, opus 48 (1848–51)
 Pieces for piano, opus 50 (1816–1854)
 Pieces for piano, opus 51 (1853)
 Pieces for piano, opus 52 (1853)
 Pieces for piano, opus 55 (1855)

References

Sources

Further reading

External links 
 
 Dictionnaire pratique et historique de la musique (1926)
 Marie Bobillier on Bleu nuit éditeur
 Marie Bobillier on IdRef

1858 births
People from Lunéville
1918 deaths
19th-century French musicologists
20th-century French musicologists
Women musicologists
19th-century French women
French biographers
Women biographers
Music historians
French music critics
French women critics